Swansea is a St. Louis Metrolink station. The station is located in Swansea, Illinois between Illinois State Routes 159 and 161. This is primarily a commuter station and has 716 park and ride spaces and 25 long-term spaces.

The Swansea station has a connection to the St. Clair County Transit District's 14 mile (22.5 km) MetroBikeLink shared-use path system. This was the first segment of the MetroBikeLink system when it opened in 2002 and consisted of a 4 mile (6.4 km) trail, running from the Swansea station to Southwestern Illinois College. Just south of this station, trail users can connect to the Richland Creek Greenway in Belleville, Illinois.

In 2019, an $11 million transit-oriented development called Metro Landing of Swansea opened on a vacant lot next to the park and ride lot and caters to adults seeking an independent lifestyle at an affordable cost.

Station layout

References

External links
 St. Louis Metro
Station from Google Maps Street View

St. Clair County Transit District
MetroLink stations in St. Clair County, Illinois
Red Line (St. Louis MetroLink)
Railway stations in the United States opened in 2001